The 2017 ICF Canoe Slalom World Championships was the 38th edition of the ICF Canoe Slalom World Championships. The event took place from 22 September to 1 October 2017 in Pau, France under the auspices of International Canoe Federation (ICF) at the Pau-Pyrénées Whitewater Stadium. Pau was also hosting the Wildwater Canoeing World Championships as part of the same event.

The Mixed C2 event returned to the world's program for the first time since 1981. The men's C2 team event was not a world championship event due to only 4 countries participating. A non-olympic event must have participants from at least 6 countries to be counted as a world championship.

A brand new medal event was the Extreme K1 which has been part of the World Cup program since 2016.

Schedule
13 events were held.

All times listed are UTC+2.

Medal summary

Medal table

Men

Canoe

Kayak

Women

Canoe

Kayak

Mixed

Canoe
The Mixed C2 event returned to the world championships after a 36-year absence. 11 crews signed up for the event. There were no heats. Top 10 from the semifinal advanced to the final. The gate setup was the same as for the heats of the other individual events, but different from the setup used for the semifinals and finals of those events.

See also
2017 Canoe Slalom World Cup
2017 Wildwater Canoeing World Championships

References

External links
ICF website

World Canoe Slalom Championships
ICF Canoe Slalom World Championships
2017 in French sport
Canoeing and kayaking competitions in France
International sports competitions hosted by France
Sport in Pau, Pyrénées-Atlantiques
ICF Canoe Slalom World Championships
ICF Canoe Slalom World Championships